Ferdinand de la Cerda (23 October 1255 – 25 June 1275) was the heir apparent to the Crown of Castile as the eldest son of Alfonso X and Violant of Aragon. His nickname, de la Cerda, means "of the bristle" in Spanish, a reference to being born with a full head of hair.

In November 1268 he married Blanche, the daughter of King Louis IX of France. They had two sons:

 Alfonso de la Cerda (1270-1333), who was believed to have married Matilde of Narbonne, daughter of Viscount Aimery VI of Narbonne. Recent research showed that Alfonso de la Cerda married Matilde of Brienne, daughter of John I of Brienne.  They had four sons and three daughters.
 Fernando de la Cerda (1275-1322), who married Juana Núñez de Lara, called "la Palomilla", Lady of Lara & Herrera, daughter of Juan Núñez de Lara “el Mayor” and Teresa Álvarez de Azagra. They had one son and three daughters.  One daughter, Blanca Núñez de Lara, was the mother-in-law to King Henry II of Castile.

Ferdinand became regent of Castile in November 1274 when his father left for Germany. In May 1275 the Marinids from Morocco landed in Spain upon call from Muhammad II of Granada and attacked Castile. Ferdinand raised troops and moved south from Burgos to defend the kingdom but died unexpectedly in Villa Real on 25 June 1275 leaving Castile open to invasion. His sons did not inherit the throne of their grandfather, since their uncle Sancho, who had repulsed the Moorish invasion, usurped the throne.

Ancestry

References

1255 births
1275 deaths
House de la Cerda
Castilian infantes
Heirs apparent who never acceded
Sons of kings